Parliamentary elections were held in Togo on 6 February 1994, with a second round on 18 March in 24 constituencies. The first multi-party elections since the 1960s, they saw the ruling Rally of the Togolese People (RPT) finish second behind the Action Committee for Renewal (CAR), who together with their allies the Togolese Union for Democracy (UTD), gained a majority in the National Assembly.

Results

Aftermath
Following the elections, the RPT lodged a complaint with the Supreme Court, resulting in invalidation of three seats (two won by the CAR and one by the UTD). Nevertheless, they maintained a majority in the Assembly, and nominated CAR leader Yawovi Agboyibo for the post of Prime Minister. However, RPT leader President Gnassingbé Eyadéma refused to accept the nomination, and instead appointed UTD leader Edem Kodjo. As a result, the CAR pulled out of their alliance with the UTD, and were replaced in government by the RPT.

By-elections for the invalidated three seats were held in August 1996, with all three seats won by the RPT.

References

Togo
1994 in Togo
Elections in Togo
Election and referendum articles with incomplete results
February 1994 events in Africa